Willi Geiger may refer to:

Willi Geiger (painter)
Willi Geiger (judge)
Willi Geiger (visual effects artist)